Erik Holmberg (23 May 1922 – 18 September 1998) was a Norwegian international football defender. He played his entire career at Fredrikstad FK, and won the Norwegian Cup in 1950 and the Hovedserien four times (in 1948–49, 1950–51, 1951–52 and 1953–54). He was capped 27 times for Norway, and participated at the Helsinki Olympics in 1952. After his retirement he was the head coach of Fredrikstad from 1956 to 1957, and Østsiden from 1966 to 1968.

References

1922 births
1998 deaths
Sportspeople from Fredrikstad
Norwegian footballers
Eliteserien players
Norway international footballers
Association football defenders
Olympic footballers of Norway
Footballers at the 1952 Summer Olympics
Fredrikstad FK players
Norwegian football managers
Fredrikstad FK managers